Perilli is an Italian surname. Notable people with the surname include:

Alessandra Perilli (born 1988), Sammarinese sport shooter
Alessio Perilli (1983–2004), Italian motorcycle racer
Arianna Perilli (born 1978), Sammarinese sport shooter
Frank Ray Perilli (born 1925), American screenwriter, playwright and actor
Ivo Perilli (1902–1994), Italian screenwriter
Lorenzo Perilli, Italian classicist and academic
Simone Perilli (born 1995), Italian footballer

Italian-language surnames